Darvar Mahalleh (also Romanized as Darvār Maḩalleh; also known as Darreh Vārī and Darrehvār Maḩalleh-ye Chūbar) is a village in Chubar Rural District, Haviq District, Talesh County, Gilan Province, Iran. At the 2006 census, its population was 425, in 91 families.

Language 
Linguistic composition of the village.

References 

Populated places in Talesh County

Azerbaijani settlements in Gilan Province